The Bosporan kings were the rulers of the Bosporan Kingdom, an ancient Hellenistic Greco-Scythian state centered on the Kerch Strait (the Cimmerian Bosporus) and ruled from the city of Panticapaeum. Panticapaeum was founded in the 7th or 6th century BC; the earliest known king of the Bosporus is Archaeanax, who seized control of the city  480 BC as a usurper. The Archaeanactid dynasty ruled the city until it was displaced by the more long-lived Spartocid dynasty in 438 BC. After ruling for over three centuries, the Spartocids were then displaced by the Mithridatic dynasty of Pontus and then its offshoot the Tiberian-Julian dynasy. The Tiberian-Julian kings ruled as client kings of the Roman Empire until late antiquity.

After several successive periods of rule by groups such as the Sarmatians, Alans, Goths and Huns, the remnants of the Bosporan Kingdom were finally absorbed into the Roman Empire by Justinian I in the 6th century AD.

List of kings 
Joint rulers are indicated with indentation.

Archaeanactid dynasty (c. 480–438 BC) 

Archaeanax c. 480 BC–?
The number of successors of Archaenax and their names are not known. His family ruled until c. 438 BC.

Spartocid dynasty (438–111 BC) 

Spartokos I 438–433 BC
Satyros I 433–389 BC
Seleukos 433–393 BC
Leukon I 389–349 BC
Gorgippos 389–349 BC
Paerisades I 349–311 BC
Spartokos II 349–344 BC
Satyros II 311–310 BC
Prytanis 310–309 BC
Eumelos 309–304 BC
Spartokos III 304 BC–284 BC
Paerisades II 284–c. 250 BC
Spartokos IV c. 250–c. 240 BC
Leukon II c. 240–210 BC
Hygiainon (regent) c. 210–c. 200 BC
Spartokos V c. 200–c. 180 BC
Kamasarye (queen) c. 180–c. 160 BC
Paerisades III c. 180–c. 170 BC
Paerisades IV c. 170–c. 150 BC (with Kamasarye and then alone)
Spartokos VI (?) c. 150–c. 140 BC
Paerisades V c. 140–111 BC

Scythian rule (111–110 BC) 
 Saumakos 111–110? BC

Mithridatic dynasty (110 BC–AD 8) 

 Mithridates I 110 BC–63 BC
 Pharnaces 63–48 BC
 Dynamis (queen) & Asander 48–47 BC (first reign)
 Mithridates II 47 BC–44/43 BC
 Dynamis (queen) 44/43 BC–c. AD 7/8 (second reign), with husbands:
 Asander 44/43–c. 17 BC (second reign) 
 Scribonius c. 15? BC 
 Polemon I c. 12/13–8 BC

Tiberian-Julian dynasty (8–341) 

 Aspurgus 8/10–38 AD
 Polemon II of Pontus 38–41
 Rhescuporis I (?) 14–42
 Gepaepyris (queen)
 Mithridates III 42–46
 Cotys I 46–78
 Incorporated as a part of the Roman Province of Moesia Inferior 63–68
 Rhescuporis II 78–93
 Sauromates I 93–123
 Cotys II 123–131
 Rhoemetalces 131–153
 Eupator 154–170
 Sauromates II 172–210
 Rhescuporis III 211–228
 Cotys III 228–234
 Sauromates III 229–232
 Rhescuporis IV 233–234
 Chedosbios 233–234 (?)
 Ininthimeus 234–239 (possibly non-dynastic)
 Rhescuporis V 240–276
 Pharsanzes 253–254 (possibly non-dynastic)
 Teiranes 276–278
 Sauromates IV 276
 Theothorses 279–309 (possibly non-dynastic)
 Rhadamsades 309–322 (possibly non-dynastic)
 Rhescuporis VI 314–341

Later rulers (341–527) 
The end of Rhescuporis VI's reign is believed to have marked the end of the Tiberian-Julian dynasty. Details of the Bosporan Kingdom are scant thereafter but it appears to have undergone several successive periods of rule by Sarmatians, Alans, Goths and Huns. There was probably a continuous sequence of rulers but few names are known.

 Douptounos fl. c. 483
 Gordas fl. 527 (Hunnic ruler)
 Mugel c. 527 (Hunnic ruler)
Mugel's rule in the Bosporus was brief; shortly after Gordas's death Justinian I sent an army to place the Bosporus under Roman rule. Mugel thereafter ruled only Patria Onoguria in the north.

Family tree 
This family tree covers the rulers of the Mithridatic and Tiberian-Julian dynasties. Owing to much of the sequence of Tiberian-Julian rulers being based on coinage, the relationships within the Tiberian-Julian dynasty (especially for later rulers) are largely conjectural and speculative. Conjectural and speculative lines of descent are marked with dotted lines. Though genealogical information is completely unknown for kings after Cotys III, the repeating names lead most researchers to believe that the later kings until at least 341 were part of the same continuous dynasty.

Notes

References 

Monarchs of the Bosporan Kingdom